Santa Igia or Santa Ilia, modern Santa Gilla lagoon (Santa Ilia being a contraction of Santa Cecilia), was a city in Sardinia, in what is now Italy, which existed from the 9th century AD to 1258, when it was destroyed by Pisan troops. It was the capital of the Giudicato of Cagliari, one of the kingdoms in which the island was divided in medieval times.

Parts of its remains are now found in Cagliari, as well as in the island of Sa Illetta.

History
The area of Santa Igia was inhabited by the Phoenicians and the Romans. The latter, in particular, built a port (Portus Scipio) on the shores of the Stagno di Santa Gilla.

In 718 Arab pirates launched their first raids against Cagliari, destroying sectors of the city and enslaving some inhabitants. Thus some of the Cagliaritani moved to the area facing the island of Santa Gilla, founding the city of Santa Igia, whose port had been used also by the Byzantines. Starting from the 9th century AD, it became the seat of the giudice, the archbishop and the administration of the giudicato of Cagliari. The area was walled and connected to the Castle of St. Michael.

In 1257, during the process of conquest of the Giudicato of Cagliari, the Pisans destroyed it.

References

Sources

Former populated places in Italy
Medieval Sardinia
1258 disestablishments in Europe
History of Cagliari